Gregory Tardy is an American jazz saxophonist, who has released albums for the record labels SteepleChase Records, J Curve Records, and Impulse! Records. As of May 2015 he is teaching at the University of Tennessee, Knoxville. He has played with Elvin Jones, Avishai Cohen, Aaron Goldberg, Brad Mehldau, and Joshua Redman, among others.

Discography

With Tom Harrell
The Art Of Rhythm (RCA Bluebird, 1998)

With Andrew Hill
A Beautiful Day (Palmetto, 2002)
Time Lines (Blue Note, 2006)

With Dave Douglas
Soul on Soul (RCA Victor, 2000)
El Trilogy (RCA/BMG, 2001)

With Brian Lynch/Eddie Palmieri Project
Simpatico (ArtistShare, 2005)
With Chris Potter
Song for Anyone (Sunnyside, 2007)
With Marcus Printup
Peace In The Abstract (SteepleChase, 2006)
Homage (SteepleChase, 2010)

With Bill Frisell
History, Mystery (Nonesuch, 2008)
Four (Blue Note, 2022)

With Craig Brann
Advent(ure) (SteepleChase, 2012)

References

External links
 Official site

Living people
GRP Records artists
Impulse! Records artists
Palmetto Records artists
SteepleChase Records artists
1966 births
21st-century saxophonists
The New Jazz Composers Octet members